Mark Levitan (May 12, 1948 - May 21, 2021) was an American academic.
He received a PhD from the New School for Social Research in  1994 with a thesis "Stability and change in the inter-industry wage distribution : the case of U.S. manufacturing, 1973 to 1987".
He wrote a number of reports for the Community Service Society of New York and the Federal Reserve Bank of New York.  Levitan served as the Director of Poverty Research at the New York City Center for Economic Opportunity (CEO) for seven years, leading efforts to create an alternate poverty measure that sought to account for New York City's high cost of living and the effects of anti-poverty programs.

Publications
Levitan, Mark. Opportunity at Work: The New York City Garment Industry. New York, NY: Community Service Society of New York, 1998. Opportunity at Work: The New York City Garment Industry  OCLC 735229349
Levitan, Mark. New York City's Labor Market, 1994-1997: Profiles and Perspectives. New York, NY: Community Service Society of New York, 1998. ISBN 9780881562538
Levitan, Mark, and Robin Gluck. Mothers' Work Single Mothers' Employment, Earnings, and Poverty in the Age of Welfare Reform. ERIC Clearinghouse, 2002.  OCLC 1062984401
Levitan, Mark. A Crisis of Black Male Employment: Unemployment and Joblessness in New York City. New York, NY: Community Service Society, 2004. OCLC 54927130
Community Service Society of New York, and Mark Levitan. Poverty in New York City, 2004: Recovery? New York, NY: Community Service Society, 2005. OCLC 1226723759
Community Service Society of New York, and Mark Levitan. Out of School, Out of Work...Out of Luck?: New York's Disconnected Youth. 2005. OCLC 1226731371
Community Service Society of New York, and Mark Levitan. Poverty in New York City, 2005: More Families Working, More Working Families Poor. 2006. OCLC 1226729188
Levitan, Mark, and Susan S. Wieler. Poverty in New York City, 1966-99: The Influence of Demographic Change, Income Growth, and Income Equality.  New York, NY: Federal Reserve Bank of New York, 2008. <>.OCLC 240327130
Levitan, Mark. Accounting for Housing Needs in a High Rent City: Poverty Research by the New York City Center for Economic Opportunity. [Madison, Wis.]: [University of Wisconsin—Madison], 2010. . OCLC 757368105
Levitan, Mark, and Daniel Scheer. Estimating the Impact of Food Stamps on the New York City Poverty Rate Using a National Academy of Sciences-Style Poverty Measure. Madison, Wis: Institute for Research on Poverty, University of Wisconsin-Madison, 2011.  OCLC 779499389

References

1948 births
2021 deaths
The New School alumni